France competed at the 1998 Winter Olympics in Nagano, Japan.

Medalists

Alpine skiing

Men

Women

Women's combined

Biathlon

Men

Men's 4 × 7.5 km relay

Women

Women's 4 × 7.5 km relay

 1 A penalty loop of 150 metres had to be skied per missed target.
 2 One minute added per missed target.

Bobsleigh

Cross-country skiing

Men

 1 Starting delay based on 10 km results. 
 C = Classical style, F = Freestyle

Men's 4 × 10 km relay

Women

 2 Starting delay based on 5 km results. 
 C = Classical style, F = Freestyle

Women's 4 × 5 km relay

Figure skating

Men

Women

Pairs

Ice Dancing

Freestyle skiing

Men

Women

Ice hockey

Men's tournament

Preliminary round - Group B
Top team (shaded) advanced to the first round.

Consolation round - 11th place match

Leading scorers

Team roster
François Gravel
Cristobal Huet
Fabrice Lhenry
Serge Poudrier
Denis Perez
Jean-Philippe Lemoine
Serge Djelloul
Karl Dewolf
Jean-Christophe Filippin
Grégory Dubois
Philippe Bozon
Christian Pouget
Stéphane Barin
Bob Ouellet
Jonathan Zwikel
Anthony Mortas
Arnaud Briand
Richard Aimonetto
Pierre Allard
Maurice Rozenthal
François Rozenthal
Laurent Gras
Roger Dubé
Head coach: Jimmy Tibbets

Nordic combined 

Men's individual

Events:
 normal hill ski jumping
 15 km cross-country skiing 

Men's Team

Four participants per team.

Events:
 normal hill ski jumping
 5 km cross-country skiing

Short track speed skating

Men

Ski jumping

Snowboarding

Men's giant slalom

Men's halfpipe

Women's giant slalom

Women's halfpipe

Speed skating

Men

References
Official Olympic Reports
International Olympic Committee results database
 Olympic Winter Games 1998, full results by sports-reference.com

Nations at the 1998 Winter Olympics
1998
Winter Olympics